Volujac  (Serbian Cyrillic: Волујац) is a village located in the Užice municipality of Serbia. In the 2002 census, the village had a population of 1094.

Užice
Populated places in Mačva District